Cusco is a district in the northern Cusco Province within the Cusco Region of Peru. It is bordered by districts of Ccorca and Poroy on the west, the provinces of Anta, the Calca, and Urubamba on the north, the San Jerónimo District on the east, and the districts of Santiago and San Sebastián to the south.

Geography 
Other mountains are listed below:

See also 
 Amaru Marka Wasi
 Qullqanpata
 Santurantikuy
 Warachikuy

References

External links
  Municipalidad Provincial de Cusco
  Cusco Tour

1821 establishments in Peru